George Marsh (1515-24 April 1555) was an English Protestant martyr who died in Boughton, Chester, on 24 April 1555 as a result of the Marian Persecutions carried out against Protestant Reformers and other dissenters during the reign of Mary I of England. His death is recorded in Foxe's Book of Martyrs.

Life

George Marsh was born and lived most of his life in the parish of Deane, near Bolton, Lancashire. He was a farmer and married at the age of twenty-five. After his wife's death he left his children in the care of his parents and entered Cambridge University, where he associated with advocates of the reformed faith and in particular Lawrence Saunders. Marsh, from Catholic Lancashire, probably became a Protestant while at Cambridge. Nicholas Ridley, the Bishop of London ordained him deacon in 1552 and the following year he became the curate at Church Langton in Leicestershire and the church of All Hallows Bread Street in London where Lawrence Saunders was the incumbent. He was said to be a tall man who had a clever way with words and a popular preacher. He was for a time employed by the king, but fell out of favour during the reign of Queen Mary I. After Saunders was arrested in 1554 George Marsh went north and continued preaching the Protestant faith in the parishes of Deane, Eccles and elsewhere in Lancashire.

A warrant was issued for Marsh's arrest for heresy by Edward Stanley, 3rd Earl of Derby. Justice Barton of Smithills Hall in Bolton sent servants to arrest him at his mother's house, but Marsh gave himself up at the hall. After being "examined" at Smithills, according to local tradition, Marsh stamped his foot so hard to re-affirm his faith that a footprint was left in the stone floor. While being questioned at Lathom House by the Earl of Derby it was thought that he could be made to conform and he was held in reasonable comfort. Marsh, however resisted the efforts to make him submit and when he refused recant was taken to Lancaster Gaol where he was brought for trial at the Quarter Sessions. For nearly a year, Marsh remained in Lancaster Gaol where he read from the Bible and prayed with townsfolk gathered outside his window until George Cotes, the Catholic Bishop of Chester intervened. Sympathisers offered support and priests tried to convert him. When statutes against heresy were enacted by parliament Marsh was taken to the gaol at Northgate, Chester. He stood trial under Bishop Cotes in the Lady Chapel of Chester Cathedral. Marsh refused to convert to Roman Catholicism, despite being given one last chance to recant while being tied to the stake at which he was about to be burned. His imprisonment is documented in Foxe's Actes and Monuments. Marsh's follower and brother-in-law Geoffrey Hurst, a Shakerley nail maker, was also imprisoned at Lancaster but was saved from execution by Queen Mary's death.

Death
George Marsh was executed in April 1555 on the north side of the road in Boughton, about a mile from Chester city centre. He was sentenced to be burned to death at the stake at the traditional execution ground. After his death his ashes were collected by his friends and buried in the nearby Saint Giles' Cemetery.

There is no grave marker in the cemetery, just a brief footnote on an inscription:

Memorials

There are two memorials to George Marsh at St Mary's Church in Deane. The base of a memorial cross in the churchyard is said to have been the base of an ancient Saxon cross from which early Christian preachers taught. It originally stood half a mile to the west of the church on New York Road. Inscriptions on its base record his martyrdom and the erection of the memorial in 1893. A window was dedicated to him in 1897 depicting Faith, Charity and Hope.

George Marsh has two memorials in Chester, one is in St John the Baptist's Church and the other is a granite obelisk erected in 1888 by the side of a road in Boughton, which has the following inscription:

Legacy and influence
In the library at Smithills Hall are some of George Marsh's personal letters and journals and a 17th-century edition of John Foxe's Book of Martyrs which documents his trial. Protestants in Chester gather outside Chester Town Hall around 24 April to commemorate the life and death of Marsh.

References

External links

Petrosomatoglyph
Christian Heritage
A brief history of Boughton

1515 births
1555 deaths
People executed under Mary I of England
16th-century Protestant martyrs
People from Bolton
History of Bolton
Executed British people
People executed by the Kingdom of England by burning
People executed for heresy
People from Deane
Protestant martyrs of England
16th-century English clergy